John S. Skopec (May 8, 1880 in Chicago, Illinois – October 20, 1912 in Chicago, Illinois), was a pitcher in Major League Baseball from 1901 to 1903. He played for the Chicago White Sox and Detroit Tigers.

External links

1880 births
1912 deaths
Major League Baseball pitchers
Chicago White Sox players
Detroit Tigers players
Little Rock Travelers players
Wheeling Stogies players
Shreveport Giants players
Colorado Springs Millionaires players
Kansas City Blues (baseball) players
Newark Sailors players
Eau Claire-Chippewa Falls Orphans players
Freeport Pretzels players
Baseball players from Illinois